Prosopis koelziana is a species of plant in the genus Prosopis.

References

External links

koelziana
Trees of Western Asia
Forages
Drought-tolerant trees